The Mall at Millenia (commonly called The Millenia Mall or Millenia) is an indoor shopping mall located in Orlando, Florida just off of Interstate 4 (exit 78) at Conroy Road near the northern end of International Drive.  Opened in 2002, it has over 150 stores, and is anchored by Macy's, Bloomingdale's, and Neiman Marcus, whose store at the mall is similar to the one at International Plaza and Bay Street in Tampa, Florida. The GLA is 1,118,000 ft2 (103,866 m2). The Mall at Millenia is the major upscale shopping destination in the Orlando area, attracting tourists desiring luxury stores including international tourists from Europe, Brazil, China, and Russia.

The mall's Macy's store was the first in Central Florida, and it was also one of only seven Macy's stores in Florida that predated the company's merger with Burdines. Bloomingdale's and Neiman Marcus are also regional firsts and these remain their only locations in the Orlando area.

History
The Mall at Millenia opened in 2002 with the current anchors.

The Mall is owned by The Forbes Company which also owns The Gardens Mall and the larger Somerset Collection, in Troy, Michigan. The Somerset Collection was used as a model for the Mall at Millenia. Like Somerset, the Mall at Millenia was designed by JPRA Architects and features award-winning lighting by Paul Gregory (Focus Lighting), glass elevators, and fountains. Neither mall has kiosks.

When the mall first opened, there was not much else in the surrounding area. That has changed in the last five years and the area in which the mall is located in now locally known as "Millenia." The area, particularly the Mall, has become a major draw for business and tourists alike. There are now apartment and condo buildings, single family homes, and corporate office buildings surrounding the mall.

Transportation and parking
The mall is serviced by Lynx buses (links) 24 and 40. Taxi service and valet parking are available at the main entrance of the mall.  Free parking surrounds the mall and is divided into sections with alphanumeric signage.  Security vehicles monitor the mall area 24 hours a day.

Notes and references

External links

The Mall at Millenia website

Buildings and structures in Orlando, Florida
Shopping malls in Florida
Taubman Centers
Tourist attractions in Orlando, Florida
Shopping malls established in 2002
2002 establishments in Florida